Jacques Duby (7 May 1922 – 15 February 2012) was a French stage, film and television actor. He was born in Toulouse.

Jacques Duby as narrator
Some of his works include 101 Dalmatians (1961), Pinocchio (1968), and The Jungle Book (1967). He also served as narrator in a French audiobook recording of Treasure Island released in 2011.

Selected filmography
 Stopover in Orly (1955)
 It Happened in Aden (1956)
 Meeting in Paris (1956)
 Short Head (1956)
 Women's Prison (1958)
 Les Novices (1970)
 Piaf (1974)

References

External links

1922 births
2012 deaths
Burials at Montmartre Cemetery
French male film actors
French male stage actors
French male television actors
French male voice actors
Male actors from Toulouse